Tolulope Adesua Etomi-Wellington (born 22 February 1988), professionally known as Adesua Etomi  is a Nigerian actress. In 2014, she starred in her first feature film Knocking On Heaven's Door. She won the Best Actress in a Drama award at the 2016 Africa Magic Viewers Choice Awards for her role in the 2015 romantic drama film Falling.

Early life and education 
Tolulope Adesua Etomi was born in Owerri, Imo State, several major sources claims her birthdate is 22 February 1988. However, in an interview published in January 2016, Etomi told Pulse Nigeria she was 29 years old. Furthermore, Answers Africa published an article in March 2016 stating that she was 30 years old. Her father is a soldier of Esan descent and her mother is an engineer of Yoruba descent. She is the youngest of three siblings. Etomi attended Corona School in Victoria Island, Lagos, where she joined the drama club at the age of seven. Thereafter, she attended Queen's College, Lagos before moving to the United Kingdom at the age of 13. Etomi later obtained a diploma in "physical theatre, musical theatre and performing arts" from City College Coventry in 2004. After completing these courses in 2006 with triple distinctions, she studied drama and performance at the University of Wolverhampton, graduating with first-class honours.

Career
Etomi's film credits include The Arbitration, The Wedding Party, and Falling. Her performance in Falling earned her the 2016 Africa Magic Viewers Choice Award for Best Actress in a  Drama. Other notable films she has appeared in include A Soldier's Story (2015), Out of Luck (20,15), and Couple of Days (2016). Etomi played Shiela in the fourth and fifth seasons of Shuga, a television soap opera about HIV/AIDS prevention. Etomi began starring as Amaka Obiora, an undercover police officer, in Yemisi Wada's crime series LasGidi Cops, which debuted in June 2016 on television. She was also featured on Vogue's list of 14 global superstars. In February 2022, she released her first single titled ‘So Natural’.

Personal life

Etomi got engaged to Banky W in February 2017. The couple held their traditional marriage on 19 November, court wedding on 20 November and white wedding on 25 November 2017; the latter ceremony was held in Cape Town, South Africa. In early January 2021, Adesua and Banky W had a son named Hazaiah Wellington.

On 5 April 2021, Adesua and Banky W shared the story of their marriage and their struggles with conception and child hearing titled 'Final Say Faith'. This story was shared in the Waterbrook church. 

Adesua was credited for saving the daughter of Nollywood actress Iretiola Doyle from bullies.

Filmography

Film

Television

Theatre

Voice over

Awards and nominations

See also
List of Nigerian actresses

Notes

References

External links

Living people
21st-century Nigerian actresses
Actresses from Imo State
Alumni of the University of Wolverhampton
Yoruba actresses
Esan actresses
Nigerian film actresses
Nigerian television actresses
Nigerian expatriates in the United Kingdom
Queen's College, Lagos alumni
Age controversies
1988 births
Nigerian film producers